Belk is an English surname. Notable people with this surname include:

 Bill Belk (born 1946), American football defensive lineman
 Darren Belk, English songwriter, bassist, and guitarist
 Habib Belk (born 1989), Moroccan gnawa singer, songwriter, and multi-instrumentalist
 Irwin Belk (1922–2018), American businessman and politician
 J. Blanton Belk, Up With People founder and chairman emeritus
 John M. Belk (1920–2007), head of a department store chain
 Mary Gardner Belk (born 1956), politician
 Paul Belk (born 1977), former competitive swimmer
 Rocky Belk (1960–2010), American football wide receiver
 Russell W. Belk, American business academic
 Tim Belk (born 1970), baseballer

Surnames of English origin